Ye Htut (born 20 March 1942) is a Burmese politician who currently serves as an Amyotha Hluttaw MP for Sagaing Region No. 5 constituency. He is a member of the National League for Democracy.

Early life and education
Ye Htut was  born on 20 March 1942 in Yangon, Myanmar. He graduated with B.Ecom from Yangon Institute of Economics. He is also a writer.

Political career
He is a member of the National League for Democracy. In the 2015 Myanmar general election, he was elected as an Amyotha Hluttaw member of parliament, winning a majority of 227437 votes and elected representative from Sagaing Region No. 5 parliamentary constituency.

References

Living people
1942 births
National League for Democracy politicians
People from Yangon Region